Lat Siah Moshteh (also Romanized as Lāt Sīāh Moshteh; also known as Lāt Sīā Moshteh) is a village in Katra Rural District, Nashta District, Tonekabon County, Mazandaran Province, Iran. At the 2006 census, its population was 55, in 15 families.

References 

Populated places in Tonekabon County